Susan Miller Dorsey (February 16, 1857 – February 5, 1946) served as the superintendent of the Los Angeles City Schools from 1920 to 1929.

Biography

Susan Almira Miller was born in Penn Yan, New York, the daughter of James and Hannah (Benedict) Miller. A graduate of Vassar College, Miller moved to Los Angeles in the early 1880s with her husband, the Rev. Patrick William Dorsey, who had accepted a position as minister of the First Baptist Church.

In 1894, while she was still teaching at Los Angeles High School, her husband left her and their young son.  By 1902, she was working as a school administrator. In 1920, Dorsey became the first female superintendent of Los Angeles City Schools.  She would serve in the capacity until her retirement in 1929.
 In 1937 she spoke to the prohibitionist Women's Law Observance Association and denounced realist literature that dealt with or included "the seamy things of life".

In 1937, Susan Miller Dorsey High School located in the Crenshaw district section of Los Angeles was dedicated in her honor.  She died in 1946.

Dorsey Hall, a dormitory at Scripps College, part of The Claremont Colleges in Claremont, California is named for her.

Notes and references

Soroptimist International of Los Angeles

1857 births
1946 deaths
Los Angeles Unified School District superintendents
People from Penn Yan, New York
Vassar College alumni
Baptists from New York (state)
Educators from New York (state)
American women educators